Layman Peak is a peak,  high, standing  east of Mount Bellows and  north of McIntyre Promontory, in the Queen Maud Mountains of Antarctica. It was discovered and photographed by the United States Antarctic Service on Flight C of February 29 – March 1, 1940, and surveyed by A.P. Crary in 1957–58. It was named by Crary for Frank Layman, a mechanic with the U.S. Ross Ice Shelf Traverse Party (1957–58) and Victoria Land Traverse Party (1958–59).

References

Queen Maud Mountains
Mountains of the Ross Dependency
Dufek Coast